Union is a census-designated place (CDP) comprising the downtown area of Union Township, Union County, New Jersey, United States. It was first listed as a CDP prior to the 2010 census. The area is also known as Union Center.

The CDP is bordered by Caldwell Avenue and Falls Terrace to the northwest, by Vauxhall Avenue and Haines Avenue to the northeast, by Warren Avenue to the east, by the Garden State Parkway to the southeast, by Burke Parkway to the southwest, and by Bond Drie, Rosemont Avenue, Stuyvesant Avenue, and Elmwood Avenue to the south. Connecticut Farms borders the neighborhood to the south.

New Jersey Route 82 (Morris Avenue) is the main street through Union, leading southeast  to Elizabeth and northwest  to Springfield.

Demographics

References 

Census-designated places in Union County, New Jersey
Census-designated places in New Jersey
Union Township, Union County, New Jersey